The 1997 Chase Championships was a women's tennis tournament played on indoor carpet courts at Madison Square Garden in New York City, New York, in the United States. It was the 26th edition of the year-end singles championships, the 22nd edition of the year-end doubles championships, and was part of the 1997 WTA Tour. The tournament was held November 17–23, 1997.

Finals

Singles

 Jana Novotná defeated  Mary Pierce, 7–6, 6–2, 6–3.
 It was Novotná's 4th singles title of the year and the 19th of her career.

Doubles

 Lindsay Davenport /  Jana Novotná defeated  Alexandra Fusai /  Nathalie Tauziat, 6–7, 6–3, 6–2.
It was Davenport's 13th title of the year and the 31st of her career. It was Novotná's 10th title of the year and the 86th of her career.

References

External links
 Official website

WTA Tour Championships
Chase Championships
Chase Championships
Chase Championships
1990s in Manhattan
Chase Championships
Madison Square Garden
Sports competitions in New York City
Sports in Manhattan
Tennis tournaments in New York City